Kaltak is a surname. Notable people with the surname include:

 Brian Kaltak (born 1993), Vanuatuan footballer
 Jean Kaltak (born 1994), Vanuatuan footballer 
 Michel Kaltak (born 1990), Vanuatuan footballer
 Tony Kaltak (born 1996), Vanuatuan footballer